This is an old Sanskrit work and require further details and references.

The present work Raghavayadhaveeyam contains 30 verses and deals with the story of Rama and Krishna together by adopting the style of anuloma and
prathiloma, that is, reading each stanza as such and in reverse order, theformer telling the story of Rama while the latter narrating the story of Krishna. Hence this work actually consists of 60 slokas in all. The story of Rama follows Valmiki Ramayana closely but there is a slight deviation with respect to the story of Krishna which will be explained as the work progresses. The style is rather difficult to understand and the commentary in Sanskrit is provided by the author himself to facilitate comprehension.

Author
The author Sri Venkatadhvari (17 century) was born at Arasanipalai near Kancheepuram and was the follower of Sri Vedanta Desikan. He had mastery in poetry and rhetoric. He had composed 14 works, the most important of them being Lakshmisahasram by composing which he got back his lost eyesight.

References
(1) https://openlibrary.org/works/OL24315654W/Raghav_Yadaviyam_%28by_Venkatadhwari%29

(2)
https://archive.org/details/raghav-yadaviyam-by-Venkatadhwari/page/n3/mode/2up

Sanskrit texts